Simon Anthony Callaghan (born March 7, 1983 in Cambridge, England) is a trainer of Thoroughbred racehorse who moved to the United States in 2009, where he established a racing stable at Santa Anita Park.

Callaghan's father Neville, was a racehorse trainer at Newmarket, where Callaghan got his start assisting his father in various aspects of training. Neville Callaghan trained for thirty-seven years before retiring in 2007, with his best horse probably being Danehill Dancer.

References

1983 births
Sportspeople from Cambridge
British racehorse trainers
American racehorse trainers
Living people